Edward Hunsinger (June 8, 1901 – August 23, 1960) was an American football player and coach. He played college football as an end at the University of Notre Dame. He played for the Fighting Irish from 1922 until 1924 and was a member of the "Seven Mules" line that blocked for the famed Four Horsemen. Hunsinger had not played football prior to his time with the Irish.

Hunsinger was involved with the Irish All-Stars 1925 exhibition game against the Pottsville Maroons, which led to the Maroons being stripped of the 1925 NFL Championship. Also in 1925, Hunsinger was signed on to play professional football for the Waterbury/Hartford Blues, which were later members of the National Football League (NFL) in 1926. By 1926, he was playing for the Brooklyn Horsemen of the first American Football League.

During the mid-1930s Hunsinger was an ends coach at Fordham University, where he moved Vince Lombardi from end to guard. He served as the head football coach at Niagara University from 1935 to 1936.

Hunsinger died on August 23, 1960, at Philadelphia General Hospital in Philadelphia, Pennsylvania.

References

Additional sources
 Notre Dame All-Time Line-ups: 1910-1929
 When Pride Still Mattered: A Life of Vince Lombardi By David Maraniss
 Interviewing Sinners & Saints By David W. Hazen
 

1901 births
1960 deaths
American football ends
Brooklyn Horsemen players
Fordham Rams football coaches
Hartford Blues players
Niagara Purple Eagles football coaches
Notre Dame Fighting Irish football players
Villanova Wildcats football coaches
Waterbury Blues players
Sportspeople from Chillicothe, Ohio
Coaches of American football from Ohio
Players of American football from Ohio